Graf is a German comital title, which is part of many compound titles.

Graf may also refer to:

 Graf (surname)
 Graf, Iowa, an American city
 Graf Ignatievo, a Bulgarian village, home to the Graf Ignatievo Air Base
 Graf, slang term for a paragraph
 GRAF1, a human protein

See also
 Graf Zeppelin (disambiguation)
 Graff (disambiguation)
 Graph (disambiguation)
 Grof (disambiguation)
 Groff (disambiguation)